William, Willy or Will Conley may refer to:

William G. Conley (1866–1940), American politician who served as Governor of West Virginia
William Conley Jr. (born 1953), American state legislator in Rhode Island
William Henry Conley (1840–1897), American industrialist and philanthropist
William H. Conley (1907–1974), American educator and founding president  of the Sacred Heart University
William M. Conley (born 1956), American federal judge
Willy Conley (born 1958), American photographer